Senator Goff may refer to:

Members of the United States Senate
Guy D. Goff (1866–1933), U.S. Senator from West Virginia from 1925 to 1931
Nathan Goff Jr. (1843–1920), U.S. Senator from West Virginia from 1913 to 1919

United States state senate members
Abe Goff (1899–1984), Idaho State Senate
Darius Goff (1809–1891), Rhode Island State Senate